Robert Swain (26 March 1944 – January 2016) was an English footballer who played as a winger.

Career
Born in Ripon, Swain signed for Bradford City as an amateur in September 1961. He made 7 league appearances for the club, before being released in 1963.

Sources

References

1944 births
2016 deaths
English footballers
Bradford City A.F.C. players
English Football League players
Association football wingers